Puspa  (meaning beautiful) is an Indonesian / Sanskrit Indian name that may refer to the following notable people:
Puspa Arumsari (born 1993), Indonesian pencak silat practitioner
Swietenia Puspa Lestari (born 1994), Indonesian diver, environmental engineer and environmental activist
Shendy Puspa Irawati (born 1987), Indonesian badminton player
Titiek Puspa (born 1937), Indonesian singer and songwriter

See also
Pushpa (disambiguation)
Puspa Indah, a 1980 album by Indonesian singer Chrisye